Robert or Bob Chambers may refer to:

 Robert Chambers (English judge) (1737–1803), English judge, professor of jurisprudence, Chief Justice of Bengal, collector of Sanskrit manuscripts
 Robert Chambers (New Zealand judge) (1953–2013), New Zealand judge and Supreme Court justice
 Robert Chambers (priest) (1571–1628), English Catholic priest, writer and translator
 Robert Chambers (publisher, born 1802) (1802–1871), Scottish publisher, writer, and scientist known for Vestiges of Creation and, with his brother William Chambers, Chambers's Encyclopaedia
 Robert Chambers Jr. (1832–1888), Scottish publisher and amateur golfer, son of the above
 Robert Craig Chambers (1832–1901), American 19th-century businessman, minerals miner, banker, politician, sheriff, and silver mine supervisor
 Robert Chambers (oarsman) (1831–1868), English oarsman and world sculling champion
 Robert Chambers (development scholar) (born 1932), British academic and development practitioner
 Robert Chambers (Quebec City mayor) (1834–1886), Canadian politician
 Robert W. Chambers (1865–1933), American artist and writer, author of The King in Yellow
 Robert Chambers (criminal) (born 1966), also known as the Preppie Killer
 Robert G. Chambers (1924–2016), British physicist known for the first observation of the Aharonov-Bohm effect
 Robert Chambers (Canadian politician) (1813–1875), merchant and politician in Nova Scotia, Canada
 Robert Chambers (cricketer) (born 1943), former English cricketer
 Robert Charles Chambers (born 1952), United States federal judge
 Robert Chambers (biologist) (1881–1957), American biologist
 Robert Chambers (sculptor) (born 1958), American sculptor
 Bob Chambers (footballer) (1899–1972), English footballer
 Bob Chambers (cartoonist) (1905–1996), cartoonist and illustrator from Nova Scotia
 Bob Chambers (athlete) (1926–2010), American track and field athlete